Nokia 3.1 Plus is a Nokia branded smartphone from HMD Global and is the larger variant of the Nokia 3.1. It was publicly introduced in October 2018 and is aimed at the budget smartphone market. One of its most visible features is the presence of a rear mount fingerprint sensor and dual cameras.

This phone is part of Google's Android One program, meaning it will receive at least 2 years of software updates and 3 years of security updates.

Reception 
This phone was relatively well received, often being praised for its build quality, display, battery life, and camera, although performance was generally criticized for being sluggish. It has also been criticised for its lack of fast charging and having a MicroUSB port instead of USB C. The Nokia 3.1 Plus also happens to be among the first to be available through a US carrier, Cricket Wireless, making it more accessible to a wider range of people.

References

External links
 Official Nokia 3.1 Plus website

3.1 Plus
Mobile phones introduced in 2018
Mobile phones with multiple rear cameras